William H. Edwards was an educator and farmer from Sussex, Wisconsin who served as a member of the Wisconsin State Legislature as a Republican member of the Wisconsin State Assembly and the Wisconsin State Senate between 1915 and 1935. He was not a candidate for re-election to the Senate in 1934, and was succeeded by Democrat Chester Dempsey.

References 

Republican Party members of the Wisconsin State Assembly
Republican Party Wisconsin state senators
People from Waukesha County, Wisconsin